Collapse action is a device behaviour that snaps a switch into place, usually using a bistable element. When flipping a light switch, strain on one spring increases until it flips position, pulling down the switch.  Collapse action allows one to remove their hand from the switch without risk of it falling to the down position, as the force needed to overcome the resistance is too great. The action also does not exert force in the lower position, avoiding a spontaneous rise to the up position.

See also
 Switch
 Hysteresis
 Buckling spring

References

Mechanical engineering